The Battle of Deefa took place in May 1968 where a battalion of the Sultan of Oman's Armed Forces attacked a rebel position at Deefa, in the Jebel Qamar and was defeated.

Dhofar Rebellion
May 1968 events in Asia
1968 in Oman